Hydrocotyle, also called floating pennywort, water pennywort, Indian pennywort, dollar weed, marsh penny, thick-leaved pennywort and even white rot is a genus of prostrate, perennial aquatic or semi-aquatic plants formerly classified in the family Apiaceae, now in the family Araliaceae.

Description
Water pennyworts, Hydrocotyles, are very common. They have long creeping stems that often form dense mats, often in and near ponds, lakes, rivers, and marshes, and some species in coastal areas by the sea. 
Leaves Simple, with small leafy outgrowth at the base, kidney shaped to round. Leaf edges are scalloped. The leaf surfaces of Hydrocotyle are prime grounds for oviposition of many butterfly species, such as Anartia fatima.
Flowers Flower clusters are simple and flat-topped or rounded. Involucral bracts at the base of each flower. Indistinct sepals. 
Fruits and reproduction Elliptical to round with thin ridges and no oil tubes (vitta) which is characteristic in the fruit of umbelliferous plants.
The prostrate plants reproduce by seed and by sending roots from stem nodes.

Selected species
The genus Hydrocotyle has between 75 and 100 species that grow in tropical and temperate regions worldwide. A few species have entered the world of cultivated ornamental aquatics.  A list of selected species:
Hydrocotyle americana L. — American marshpennywort
Hydrocotyle asiatica L. is now correctly known as Centella asiatica
Hydrocotyle batrachium Hance
Hydrocotyle benguetensis Elm.
Hydrocotyle bonariensis Lam. — largeleaf pennywort
Hydrocotyle bowlesioides Mathias & Constance — largeleaf marshpennywort
Hydrocotyle calcicola
Hydrocotyle dichondroides Makino
Hydrocotyle dielsiana
Hydrocotyle heteromeria — waxweed
Hydrocotyle hexagona
Hydrocotyle himalaica
Hydrocotyle hirsuta Sw. — yerba de clavo
Hydrocotyle hirta
Hydrocotyle hitchcockii
Hydrocotyle hookeri
Hydrocotyle hydrophila - endemic to New Zealand
Hydrocotyle javanica  Thunb.
Hydrocotyle keelungensis Liu, Chao & Chuang
Hydrocotyle leucocephala Cham. & Schltdl. — Brazilian pennywort
Hydrocotyle mannii Hook.f.
Hydrocotyle microphylla A.Cunn.
Hydrocotyle moschata G. Forst. — musky marshpennywort
Hydrocotyle nepalensis Hook.
Hydrocotyle novae-zelandiae DC.
Hydrocotyle phoenix A.J. Perkins — fire pennywort
Hydrocotyle prolifera Kellogg — whorled marshpennywort
Hydrocotyle pseudoconferta
Hydrocotyle pusilla A. Rich. — tropical marshpennywort
Hydrocotyle ramiflora
Hydrocotyle ranunculoides L. f. — floating marshpennywort, floating marshpennywort, floating pennyroyal
Hydrocotyle salwinica
Hydrocotyle setulosa Hayata
Hydrocotyle sibthorpioides Lam. — lawn marshpennywort
Hydrocotyle tambalomaensis
Hydrocotyle tripartita
Hydrocotyle umbellata L. — manyflower marshpennywort, umbrella pennyroyal
Hydrocotyle verticillata Thunb. — whorled marshpennywort, whorled marshpennywort, whorled pennyroyal
Hydrocotyle vulgaris L. — marsh pennywort, common pennywort 
Hydrocotyle wilfordii
Hydrocotyle wilsonii
Hydrocotyle yanghuangensis

Distribution
Hydrocotyleae grow in wet and damp places in the tropics and the temperate zones.

Fossil record
One fossil fruit of a Hydrocotyle sp. has been extracted from borehole samples of the Middle Miocene fresh water deposits in Nowy Sacz Basin, West Carpathians, Poland.

References

External links

 
Apiales genera
Taxa named by Carl Linnaeus
Aquatic plants